Ana Paula Vitorino (born 1962) is a Portuguese politician who most recently served as Minister of Maritime Affairs from 2015 to 2019, in the XXI Constitutional Government. She is a member of the Socialist Party. From 2005 to 2009, Vitorino served as the Secretary of State for Transport. Elected as a deputy in the Assembly of the Republic in the 2019 Portuguese legislative election she resigned in mid-2021, to be replaced by Sofia Andrade.

References

1962 births
Living people
Government ministers of Portugal
Women government ministers of Portugal
Socialist Party (Portugal) politicians